Tom Clancy's Rainbow 6: Patriots is a cancelled first-person shooter video game, part of the Tom Clancy's Rainbow Six series, announced on the cover of the December 2011 issue of Game Informer. It was to be published by Ubisoft, and was developed by the company's Montreal studio, with additional development by Ubisoft Toronto and Red Storm Entertainment. Due to the death of Tom Clancy in October 2013, concern was raised that this game would become the last to bear his name. Ubisoft has since stated that they will continue putting Tom Clancy's name on future Tom Clancy titles out of respect for the late author.

Patriots was cancelled in 2014 after it was announced in 2011. Instead, Ubisoft started development on a new Rainbow Six game called Siege.

Plot
Team Rainbow is called to New York City to deal with a terrorist group calling itself the 'True Patriots'. Styling themselves as a populist militia group, the True Patriots have taken it upon themselves to act as judge, jury, and executioner on behalf and avenging the alleged victims of what they see as Wall Street corruption.

To complicate the situation, the new leader of Team Rainbow is James Wolfe, a former Navy SEAL who believes ethics are irrelevant in dealing with the True Patriots. As Echo Leader, a man who looks up to Wolfe as a father figure, they must stop the True Patriots at all costs; even at the price of their own personal morality.

Development
After finding "reason to believe that someone may leak [their] preliminary target gameplay footage", Ubisoft chose to pre-maturely announce the game through a trailer on November 4, 2011. It was stressed that the trailer showed a pre-rendered concept created in 2010 of what a level in the final game might appear like, rather than footage of any current game build.

In March 2012, it was announced that creative director David Sears, narrative director Richard Rouse III, lead designer Philippe Therien, and animation director Brent George were all removed from the development team. Minimal news on the game appeared until May 2013, when GameStop removed Patriots from their database of upcoming games and cancelled all pre-orders.

At E3 2013, Ubisoft confirmed that the game remained in development, but would now be produced for eighth generation consoles. It had also been confirmed that players would also be able to play as the True Patriots in some capacity.

On June 9, 2014, it was announced that Patriots and its concept was scrapped. Instead, Tom Clancy's Rainbow Six Siege was announced as its replacement. The game was later released on December 1, 2015.

References

Cancelled PlayStation 3 games
Cancelled PlayStation 4 games
Cancelled Windows games
Cancelled Xbox 360 games
Cancelled Xbox One games
Multiplayer and single-player video games
Tactical shooter video games
Tom Clancy games
Tom Clancy's Rainbow Six games
Ubisoft games
Video games developed in Canada
Video games developed in the United States
Video games set in New York City
Red Storm Entertainment games